François Ngarukiyintwali (December 12, 1940 - December 5, 2015) was a Rwandan diplomat and politician. He served as Minister for Foreign Affairs and Cooperation from 1979 until  1989. Later, he was appointed as ambassador of Rwanda to Belgium until 1994.

References 

Living people
Rwandan diplomats
Rwandan politicians
1940 births